Macroglossum vacillans is a moth of the  family Sphingidae. It is known from Western Australia, the Northern Territory, Queensland and Indonesia.

Adults are brown with a broad red band across each hindwing.

References

Macroglossum
Moths described in 1865